Baldassare Calamai (Florence, November 13, 1797 - July 11, 1851) was an Italian painter, active in a neoclassical style, painting mainly historical subjects.

Biography
He was a pupil of Pietro Benvenuti in Florence. Saltini, who likely knew the artist, bemoans his failure to achieve greatness, stating: . . . he could not or would not join in the tireless study without which the most precious gifts of Providence suffer, as with the unhappy fate of the butterfly in the hands of the child. Devoted to gambling, to play, to debauchery, he neglected every beautiful discipline of the mind, and dispersed the intellect during his early life. 

Among his works were:
Galileo visited by Milton
Dante, Virgil, and Farinata degli Uberti (1825) 
Episode during Plague of 1348 in Florence''' (1828, second version 1836)Ruggiero opens the Tower of Hunger to discover corpses of Ugolino and his sons, (from Dante's Inferno, 1838).
In 1835 he painted illustrations to Dante's Divine Comedy''.

References

1797 births
1851 deaths
18th-century Italian painters
Italian male painters
19th-century Italian painters
Italian neoclassical painters
Painters from Florence
19th-century Italian male artists
18th-century Italian male artists